The 2012–13 Clemson Tigers men's basketball team represented Clemson University in the 2012–2013 college basketball season. The Tigers, led by third year head coach Brad Brownell, played their home games at Littlejohn Coliseum and were members of the Atlantic Coast Conference. They finished the season 13–18, 5–13 in ACC play to finish in 11th place. They lost in the first round of the ACC tournament to Florida State.

Departures

Recruiting

Roster

Schedule
 
|-
!colspan=9| Exhibition

|-
!colspan=9| Regular season

|-
!colspan=9| ACC tournament

References

Clemson Tigers men's basketball seasons
Clemson